Korgen is a former municipality in Nordland county, Norway. The  municipality existed from 1918 until its dissolution in 1964. The municipality included the central part of what is now Hemnes Municipality, centered around the river Røssåga. The administrative centre was the village of Korgen where Korgen Church is located.

History

The municipality of Korgen was established on 1 July 1918 when it was separated from the large Hemnes Municipality.  Initially, the municipality had 1,369 residents.  During the 1960s, there were many municipal mergers across Norway due to the work of the Schei Committee. On 1 January 1964, the municipality of Korgen (population: 3,033) was merged with Hemnes Municipality (population: 1,352), the southern district of Sør-Rana Municipality (population: 934), and the far northern part of Hattfjelldal Municipality (population: 168) to create a new, larger Hemnes Municipality.

Name
The municipality (originally the parish) is named after the old Korgen farm since the first Korgen Church was built there. The name is probably derived from the word  which means "extension". This is likely referring to the location of the farm, on a long, wide peninsula surrounded on three sides by the river Røssåga.

Government
While it existed, this municipality was responsible for primary education (through 10th grade), outpatient health services, senior citizen services, unemployment, social services, zoning, economic development, and municipal roads. During its existence, this municipality was governed by a municipal council of elected representatives, which in turn elected a mayor.

Municipal council
The municipal council  of Korgen was made up of 17 representatives that were elected to four year terms.  The party breakdown of the final municipal council was as follows:

See also
List of former municipalities of Norway

References

Hemnes
Former municipalities of Norway
1918 establishments in Norway
1964 disestablishments in Norway